Dr. Mohammad Abdullahi Omar is a Somalilander politician. He served as the Minister of Foreign Affairs of Somaliland. He was appointed to the position on July 28, 2010 by the region's incumbent President Ahmed Mahamoud Silanyo. Following a cabinet reshuffle on June 25, 2013, Omar was replaced as Foreign Minister by Mohamed Bihi Yonis. Omar subsequently served as Somaliland's Minister of Commerce until May 20, 2014, when he was dismissed from the position by presidential decree following an internal dispute over leadership succession within the ruling Peace, Unity, and Development Party (Kulmiye) party.

Notes

References

Living people
Ethnic Somali people
Government ministers of Somalia
Year of birth missing (living people)
People from Hargeisa